K. N. Panikkar (born April 26, 1936 in Guruvayoor, Kerala) is an Indian historian, associated with the Marxist school of historiography.

K. N. Panikkar has written and edited a number of books, including A Concerned Indian’s Guide to Communalism and the ICHR volume on Towards Freedom, 1940: A Documentary History of the Freedom Struggle.

His methods and his expressed positions in public life have evoked harsh criticism from exponents of Hindu nationalism, particularly during the period of Bharatiya Janata Party government of 1998 to 2004. Panikkar has been active in criticising the rise of "Nationalist" history in India. His books include Against Lord and State: Religion and Peasant Uprisings in Malabar; Culture and Consciousness in Modern India; Culture, Ideology and Hegemony – Intellectuals and Social Consciousness in Colonial India, and Before the Night Falls.
He was appointed by the government of Kerala as chairman of an Expert Committee that looked into the complaints raised from various quarters concerning new textbooks introduced to state-supported schools. The committee submitted its report in October 2008.

See also
 M. G. S. Narayanan
 A. Sreedhara Menon
 Rajan Gurukkal

References
 K N Panikkar, Attoor Ravi Varma bag Kerala Sahitya Akademi fellowships 
 'Will quit as Chancellor': Kerala Guv upset at state of higher education, writes to CM 
 In JNU, works of Gail Omvedt and Dalit scholars are relegated to ‘underground’ networks 
 Valiathan, Panikkar, Raghava Warrier get Kairali lifetime achievement awards 
 When History is Held Hostage: Commemorating the Continuing Sufferings of the Mappila Martyrs of 1921 
 Reform judiciary to protect its independence: Bhushan 
 Muslims, Hindus and the Malabar rebellion – why 1921 matters

External links
 Kerala Council for Historical Research
 

1936 births
Living people
Malayalam-language writers
Indian Marxist historians
Indian Marxist writers
Writers from Thrissur
Government Victoria College, Palakkad alumni
20th-century Indian historians
Scholars from Kerala
Indian male writers
20th-century Indian non-fiction writers
People from Guruvayur
Historians of Kerala
Recipients of the Abu Dhabi Sakthi Award